Rick Ravanello (born 24 October 1967) is a Canadian actor and ex-bodybuilder who has appeared in several television series and movies. Known primarily from action and thriller films, he often portrayed soldiers, military men and detectives.

Biography
One of several brothers, Ravanello was raised in the Trout Brook Road area of Mira, Cape Breton, and graduated from Riverview Rural High School in 1986. While a young man, he got introduced to weight training. As an actor he debuted in 1996, appearing in several television series, including Stargate SG-1 (episode "Children of the Gods") and Millennium (episode "Weeds"). He portrayed a young Marine Guard in the 1998 made-for-television action-drama film Loyal Opposition: Terror in the White House, and was subsequently cast as Private J. Vaughn in the superhero TV film Nick Fury (1998), opposite David Hasselhoff. UPN cast him as Mednaut Thurston—the role which he continued to play throughout 1998 and 1999—in the short-lived science fiction medical drama series Mercy Point. He starred as a tough military man named Thompson in the Richard Pepin-directed action film Y2K (also known as Terminal Countdown).

He played a small, supporting role of a handsome welder in the Sally Field–Judy Davis vehicle A Cooler Climate (1999), and was a recurring actor on the Canadian police procedural television series Cold Squad (October 1999). In January 2001, he guest-starred in the science-fiction–action series Seven Days opposite Jonathan LaPaglia, portraying Major Gary Jones. In the 2001 television action drama Semper Fi he portrayed the Sergeant of the United States Marine Corps. Ravanello's acting breakthrough came with 2002's Hart's War. In the movie, set in a World War II prisoner of war camp, he starred opposite Bruce Willis as Major Joe Clary.

In the 1990s Ravanello was also a competitive bodybuilder, with an on-stage weight of approximately 190 pounds (86 kilograms). He also has a second degree black belt in Taekwondo and trains Muay Thai.

Filmography

Guest appearances
Lethal Weapon playing David Garrison in episode "Surf N Turf" (#1.2), 28 September 2016 
Criminal Minds playing Bernard Graff in episode "Internal Affairs" (#11.9), 2 December 2015
Scorpion playing Marcus Bronson in episode "Young Hearts Spark Fire" (#1.19), 23 March 2015
Castle playing Steve Adams in episode "He's Dead, She's Dead" (#3.2), 27 September 2010
In Justice playing Alec Southerland in episode "Golden Boy" (#1.3), 13 January 2006
The Closer playing Devlin Dutton in episode "The Butler Did It" (#1.9), August 2005
Desperate Housewives playing Bill Cunningham in episode "There Won't Be Trumpets" (#1.17), 3 April 2005
The Inside playing Scott Bossi in episode "Aidan" (#1.9), 2005
Monk playing Detective in episode "Mr. Monk and the Captain's Wife" (#2.14), 13 February 2004
24 playing Captain Reiss in episode "Day 3: 12:00 a.m.-1:00 a.m." (#3.12), 3 February 2004
24 playing Captain Reiss in episode "Day 3: 11:00 p.m.-12:00 a.m." (#3.11), 27 January 2004
CSI: Crime Scene Investigation playing Ranger Stone in episode "Feeling the Heat" (#4.4), 23 October 2003
The Lyon's Den playing Larry/Sammy Gentry in episode "Pilot" (#1.1), 28 September 2003
Boomtown playing Sean Dornan in episode "Crash" (#1.8), 17 November 2002
Without a Trace playing Brad Dunsmore in episode "He Saw, She Saw" (#1.3), 10 October 2002
Seven Days playing Major Gary Jones in episode "Adam & Eve & Adam" (#3.10), 10 January 2001
So Weird playing Lal Nereus in episode "Fathom" (#2.20), 22 April 2000
Cold Squad playing John Hatcher in episode "Deadly Games: Part 2" (#3.2), 29 October 1999
First Wave playing Joel Langley in episode "Red Flag" (#2.6), 27 October 1999
Viper playing Sergio "Sonny" Celeste in episode "The Full Frankie" (#3.6), 26 October 1998
First Wave playing Anton in episode "Crazy Eddie" (#1.2), 16 September 1998
The Net playing Mr. Wigan in episode "Deleted" (#1.1), 19 July 1998
The Outer Limits playing Marcus in episode "In the Zone" (#4.5), 20 February 1998
Honey, I Shrunk the Kids: The TV Show playing Lars in episode "Honey, Meet the Barbarians" (#1.13), 6 February 1998
Breaker High playing Apollo in episode "Silence of the Lamborghini" (#1.18), 14 October 1997
Stargate SG-1 playing Fryatt, guard #2 in episode "Children of the Gods: Part 1" (#1.1), 27 July 1997
The Outer Limits playing Driver in episode "New Lease" (#3.11), 21 March 1997
Millennium playing Cop (uncredited) in episode "Weeds" (#1.11), 24 January 1997
Madison playing Erik in episode "Tattoos, Term Deposits and Tainted Love" (#5.9), 1997
Madison playing Erik in episode "Skin Deep" (#5.8), 1997
Viper playing Tremaine in episode "Standoff" (#1.6), 28 October 1996
Nothing Too Good for a Cowboy playing Chilco Evans in episode "The Natural" (#1.3), ????

References

External links
 

1967 births
Canadian bodybuilders
Canadian male film actors
Canadian male taekwondo practitioners
Canadian male television actors
Living people
Male actors from Nova Scotia
Male Muay Thai practitioners
Sportspeople from the Cape Breton Regional Municipality